The 2023 Miami Hurricanes football team will represent the University of Miami in the Atlantic Coast Conference (ACC) during the 2023 NCAA Division I FBS football season. The Hurricanes are expected to be led by Mario Cristobal in his second year as head coach. They played their home games at Hard Rock Stadium.

Schedule
Miami and the ACC announced the 2023 football schedule on January 30, 2023. The 2023 season will be the conference's first season since 2004 that its scheduling format includes just one division. The new format assigns Miami with three permanent conference opponents, while playing the remaining ten teams twice (home and away) in a four–year cycle. The Hurricanes' three set conference opponents for the next four years are Boston College, Florida State, and Louisville.

Personnel

Coaching staff

Roster

Game summaries

References

Miami
Miami Hurricanes football seasons
Miami Hurricanes football